Gary Wayne Otte (December 21, 1971 – September 13, 2017) was an Ohio death row inmate who was sentenced to death and executed for the 1992 murders of Robert Wasikowski (May 30, 1930 – February 12, 1992) and Sharon Kostura (December 12, 1946 – February 13, 1992), whom he killed in back-to-back robberies in February 1992 in Parma, Ohio.

Background 
Gary Otte was born on December 21, 1971 in Terre Haute, Indiana. He was described as a 'very sad little boy' who began using drugs and drinking alcohol at 10 and first attempted suicide at 14. The killings took place six years later, when Otte was 20. At his October 1992 trial, Gary Otte was sentenced to death for murder. 

Otte's IQ was purportedly only 85, although this would not bar him from execution. Otte was involved in a lawsuit challenging the constitutionality of Ohio's execution procedures, alongside fellow death row inmates Ronald Phillips and Raymond Tibbetts, which would ultimately be dismissed in late June 2017. Phillips' execution followed less than a month later on July 26. Otte made several last minute pleas for clemency, all of which would be rejected. These included claims that Ohio's lethal injection protocol violated the Eighth Amendment, and that his age at the time of the killings would make his execution unconstitutional. All of these claims were eventually denied.

Execution 
In an order published by Ohio Governor John Kasich on May 1, 2017, Otte's execution was rescheduled from June 13, 2017, to September 13, 2017. Following the denial of all his last minute appeals, Otte was executed as scheduled on the morning of Wednesday, September 13, 2017. His final meal consisted of a mushroom and Swiss cheese hamburger, a quart of Heath Bar ice cream and a slice of banana cream pie. In his final statement, Otte professed his love for his family, apologized to the families of the victims, and sang the hymn "The Greatest Thing". His final words were a statement attributed to Jesus Christ during his crucifixion: "Father, forgive them for they know not what they're doing." Otte was pronounced dead at 10:54a.m. He was 45 years old.

See also 
 Capital punishment in Ohio
 Capital punishment in the United States
 List of people executed in Ohio
 List of people executed in the United States in 2017

References 

1971 births
2017 deaths
1992 murders in the United States
21st-century executions by Ohio
American people executed for murder
People convicted of murder by Ohio
People executed by Ohio by lethal injection
February 1992 events in the United States
September 2017 events in the United States
People from Terre Haute, Indiana
American spree killers
Executed spree killers